John William Streets (24 March 1886 – 1 July 1916), better known as Will Streets, was an English soldier and poet of the First World War.

Streets was born in Whitwell, Derbyshire, the son of William and Clara Streets, and was the eldest of twelve children. Although academically and artistically gifted, he began work as a miner at the age of fourteen, continuing to educate himself in his spare time.

In August 1914, Streets joined the Sheffield City Battalion (Sheffield Pals). In late 1915 and early 1916 he served in Egypt. The battalion was subsequently transferred to the Western Front. Streets, by this time a sergeant, was wounded on the first day of the Battle of the Somme, and subsequently went missing.  His body was eventually recovered exactly ten months later, on 1 May 1917, and he is buried at Euston Road Cemetery, Colincamps, France. His poems were posthumously published in the same year under the title The Undying Splendour.

See also
List of solved missing person cases

References

External links 

1886 births
1910s missing person cases
1916 deaths
20th-century male writers
British Army personnel of World War I
British military personnel killed in the Battle of the Somme
British World War I poets
Formerly missing people
Missing in action of World War I
Missing person cases in France
People from Whitwell, Derbyshire
York and Lancaster Regiment soldiers
Military personnel from Derbyshire